Monkey Girl: Evolution, Education, Religion, and the Battle for America's Soul is a 2007 non-fiction book about the Kitzmiller v. Dover Area School District trial of 2005.  Author Edward Humes, a Pulitzer Prize-winning American journalist, interviewed interested parties to the controversy around a school board's decision to introduce the concept of intelligent design into public school lessons on science.  The book describes in detail the experiences of those caught up in the actions of the school board and the ensuing Dover trial, in the context of the intelligent design movement and the ascendency of the American religious right whose opposition to evolution led them to campaign to redefine science to accept supernatural explanations of natural phenomena.

References
Inherit the Wind, Redux – Washington Post, Reviewed by Christine Rosen, February 25, 2007
Edward Humes – The online home of Monkey Girl
Excerpt of Monkey Girl

Intelligent design
2007 non-fiction books
Ecco Press books
Books about education